Giddens Ko (born 25 August 1978) is a Taiwanese novelist and filmmaker. He earned his Bachelor of Science in Management from National Chiao Tung University and Master of Social Science from Tunghai University. He has published more than 60 books, many of which have been adapted as films. He writes under the pseudonym of "Nine Knives".

Early life
Born on 25 August 1978 in Changhua County, Taiwan, Ko grew up as the second of three sons in Changhua, where his parents own a pharmacy. Ko discovered his love of writing when he penned a story as part of his university application.

Career

Early period: establishing reputation as a novelist 
He started writing fiction in 1999, and posted most of his first works on the Internet. Ko struggled through the first five years of his writing career, before branching out into multiple genres, namely horror, science fiction, and romance. He writes 5000 words daily, and at his peak writing pace published one book per month for 14 consecutive months. This set of work helped Ko's popularity rise in Taiwan. Ko has compared himself favorably to Louis Cha, Gu Long, and Ni Kuang.

Pen name
"Jiubadao" was originally a song written by Ko as a senior high school student. The song's title stuck as a nickname when a tutor spotted students passing notes signed by Jiubadao and asked who he was. Classmates revealed Jiubadao to be Ko and he used the nickname as a pseudonym after graduating college.

Directing films 
In 2008, Ko directed the film , along with Vincent Fang, Chen Yi-xian and Huang Zijiao. In 2010, Ko directed the film You Are the Apple of My Eye, based on his book . In 2011, Ko adapted his "Killer" series into the film The Killer Who Never Kills. He produced a documentary focusing on Taiwan's animal shelters in 2012, titled Twelve Nights. In 2014, another of Ko's books was adapted into the film Café. Waiting. Love. The film adaptation of another of Ko's books, Kung Fu, was originally set to be released in 2014, but its release date was pushed back to 2015. In September 2015, Ko announced another book–to–film adaption, The Tenants Downstairs, was to be released in 2016.

In 2012, Ko notified Apple Inc. that some approved applications on the company's iOS platform were accessing pirated versions of his books. Apple initially refused to pull the apps, as the company was unsure about Ko's publisher having proper authorization to contact them. Ko traveled to Hong Kong to file a complaint in person before the matter was resolved with the removal of the apps. On 9 October 2012, Ko was chosen as one of "Ten Outstanding Young People of Taiwan" by the Junior Chamber International Taiwan.

In 2017, Ko directed the high school horror-comedy film Mon Mon Mon Monsters. Ko originally intended for the film to be a mockumentary shot entirely on iPhone. This idea, however, was eventually disregarded as the project evolved into a more personal work inspired in part by the negative publicity the director was receiving at the time for his affair with Chou.

Personal life

Family 
In October 2014, Ko admitted to cheating on his girlfriend of nine years, Hsiao-nei, with television reporter Chou Ting-yu. In early May 2015, Ko confirmed that his relationship with Hsiao-nei had ended. Ko and Chou began dating in March 2016; they married in late 2017. On 4 April 2020, Ko announced the birth of their first child, a girl.

Political views 
In October 2014 it was reported that Beijing had ordered works by Ko removed from shelves in China. A few weeks previously, Ko had shaved his head to show solidarity for Occupy Central with Love and Peace, the organization that started the 2014 Hong Kong protests.

Filmography

Awards and nominations

References

External links

1978 births
Living people
21st-century Taiwanese writers
National Chiao Tung University alumni
Tunghai University alumni
People from Changhua County
Taiwanese film directors
Taiwanese screenwriters
Taiwanese film producers
Taiwanese male writers
20th-century Taiwanese writers
20th-century pseudonymous writers
21st-century pseudonymous writers